Wyatt is an unincorporated community located in Madison Township, St. Joseph County, in the U.S. state of Indiana.

The community is part of the South Bend–Mishawaka, IN-MI, Metropolitan Statistical Area.

History
Wyatt was platted in 1894 when the railroad was extended to that point. An old variant name of the community was Littleton.

A post office has been in operation at Wyatt since 1893.

Geography

Education
Wyatt is located in the Penn-Harris-Madison School District.

References

External links
Dept. of Agriculture licensed grain warehouses in Indiana

Unincorporated communities in Indiana
Unincorporated communities in St. Joseph County, Indiana
South Bend – Mishawaka metropolitan area